The 2021 Rugby Europe Sevens Championship Series was the nineteenth edition of the continental championship for rugby sevens in Europe. The series featured eight international sides and took place over two legs, the first at Lisbon in Portugal and the second at Moscow in Russia. it served as a qualifier to the 2022 World Rugby Sevens Challenger Series.

Spain were crowned champions having won both the Lisbon and Moscow legs. England, France, Ireland, and Wales did not field teams for this tournament due to the postponement of the 2020 Summer Olympics which took place from 26 July to 31 July 2021 - where Great Britain (encompassing England and Wales) and Ireland participated - as well as national COVID restrictions in France.

As a penalty for competing in the Olympic tournament instead of this tournament, England, Ireland, and Wales were all relegated to the 2022 Trophy competition.

Schedule
The official schedule for the 2021 Rugby Europe Sevens Championship Series was:

Series standings
Final standings over the two legs of the Championship series:

Lisbon

Pool stage

Pool A

Pool B

Knockout stage

5th–8th playoffs

Championship playoffs

Placings

Moscow

Pool stage

Pool A

Pool B

Knockout stage

5th–8th playoffs

Championship playoffs

Placings

References

2021
2021 rugby sevens competitions
2021 in European sport
2021 in Portuguese sport
2021 in Russian rugby union
June 2021 sports events in Portugal
June 2021 sports events in Russia